Circum Peak is a mountain rising to  in the southeast part of Weddell Island in the Falkland Islands.

Maps

 The Falkland Islands. Scale 1:401280 map. London: Edward Stanford, 1901
 Falkland Islands Explorer Map. Scale 1:365000. Ocean Explorer Maps, 2007
 Falklands Topographic Map Series. Scale 1:50000, 29 sheets. DOS 453, 1961-1979
 Falkland Islands. Scale 1:643000 Map. DOS 906. Edition 3-OS, 1998
 Map 500k--xm20-4. 1:500000 map of Weddell Island and part of West Falkland. Russian Army Maps (for the world)
 Approaches to the Falkland Islands. Scale 1:1500000 chart. Gps Nautical Charts, 2010
 Illustrated Map of Weddell Island

Gallery

Notes

References
 B. Stonehouse (ed.). Encyclopedia of Antarctica and the Southern Oceans. Chichester, West Sussex: John Wiley & Sons, 2002. 404 pp.

External links
 Weddell Island Official Website
 Weddell Island from space. NASA Johnson Space Center, 30 April 2005

Mountains of the Falkland Islands
Geography of Weddell Island